The 1997 Triple J Hottest 100, was a countdown of the most popular songs of the year, according to listeners of the Australian radio station Triple J, and was broadcast on Australia Day 1998. A CD featuring 31 of the songs was released. A countdown of the videos of most of the songs was also shown on the ABC music series Rage.
The most popular song was announced by former Prime Minister Gough Whitlam, the namesake of the winning group.

Full list 

34 of the 100 songs were by Australian artists (marked with a green background).

Artists with multiple entries
Two entries
The Whitlams (1, 53)
The Verve (4, 22)
Radiohead (7, 9)
Jebediah (10, 33)
Silverchair (13, 27)
The Living End (15, 49)
Faith No More (31,64)
Grinspoon (34, 63)
Ween (36, 69)
The Bloodhound Gang (40, 46)
Arkarna (50, 97)
Everclear (51, 54)

CD release

The CD also has an interactive component that could be accessed on a PC.

A later version, released under the Warner label, omitted "The Beautiful People", "One Angry Dwarf and 200 Solemn Faces", "Lakini's Juice, and "The Perfect Drug", but included "Cows with Guns" by Dana Lyons on the first disc and "Cosmic Girl" by Jamiroquai on the second disc.

See also
1997 in music

Notes

1997
1997 in Australian music
1997 record charts